Nail bed may refer to:

 Nail bed (anatomy), the skin beneath the nail plate
 Bed of nails, a device sometimes used in meditation and physics demonstrations
 Bed of nails tester, a device used to test printed circuit boards

See also
 Bed of nails (disambiguation)